3rd Regiment Royal Horse Artillery is a regiment of the Royal Horse Artillery in the British Army. They are currently based at Albemarle Barracks, Northumberland, England.

The regiment was constituted in 1939 out of existing batteries. Two of the batteries have served continuously since the 1790s. Two others have served continuously since their formation in the period 1805-1811 during the Napoleonic wars. M Battery, by contrast, has served continuously since 1993.

History

Formation
The basic organic unit of the Royal Artillery was, and is, the battery. Prior to May 1938, when grouped together they formed brigades, in the same way that infantry battalions or cavalry regiments were grouped together in brigades. At the outbreak of the First World War, a field artillery brigade of headquarters (four officers, 37 other ranks), three batteries (five and 193 each), and a brigade ammunition column (four and 154) had a total strength just under 800 so was broadly comparable to an infantry battalion (just over 1,000) or a cavalry regiment (about 550). Like an infantry battalion, an artillery brigade was usually commanded by a Lieutenant-Colonel.  After May 1938, brigades were redesignated as regiments and on 27 August 1938, III Brigade Royal Horse Artillery at Abbassia, Egypt was redesignated as 3rd Regiment Royal Horse Artillery.

Also in 1938, artillery brigades were reorganized from three six-gun batteries to two 12-gun batteries.  Rather than disband existing batteries, they were instead linked in pairs.  As a result, D and J Batteries formed D/J Battery on 11 May 1938 and M and P Batteries were linked as M/P Battery on the same date. This was the regiment's structure on formation but in the event the batteries were unlinked within months (in September 1939) and the regiment operated with four batteries.

Second World War

By the outbreak of the Second World War, the regiment was still in Egypt and on 16 October 1939 was assigned to Headquarters Royal Artillery Group (Middle East Reserve) as an anti-tank regiment armed with 2 pounder guns. M Battery, however, was permanently attached to the Armoured Division (Egypt) (later the 7th Armoured Division, the "Desert Rats"). In March 1941, P Battery left the regiment to join 6th Regiment, Royal Horse Artillery in the United Kingdom. In practice just the title was transferred; the personnel and equipment were distributed amongst D, J and M batteries making them up to eight-gun units. On 1 March 1941, the regiment joined M Battery in 7th Support Group and all three batteries were redesignated as anti-tank. The regiment took part in the final attempt to lift the Siege of Tobruk, Operation Crusader (18 November10 December)notably the Battle of Sidi Rezegh where Second Lieutenant George Ward Gunn (J Battery) earned the Victoria Cross for his bravery during an attack by 60 German Tanks.  On 26 April 1954, J Battery was awarded the Honour Title "Sidi Rezegh" in recognition of this action. The regiment was rearmed with 25 pounders after Sidi Rezegh, and the batteries were redesignated as field artillery on 8 September 1942.

The regiment left the 7th Support Group on 8 February 1942 (the day before it was reformed as the 7th Motor Brigade) and was assigned directly to the 7th Armoured Division; it remained with the division for the rest of the war. The regiment supported the 7th Armoured Division during the rest of the Western Desert campaign taking part in the Battle of Gazala (26 June21 June 1942), the Defence of the El Alamein Line (127 July), the Battle of Alam el Halfa (30 August7 September), and the Battle of El Alamein (23 October4 November). It then took part in the Tunisian campaign including the Battles of Medenine (6 March 1943), Mareth (1623 March), Akarit (6 and 7 April), Enfidaville (1929 April), and Tunis (512 May).

The regiment was withdrawn to Libya to rest and refit thereby missing the Sicilian campaign. It next took part in the Italian campaign: the Salerno Landings (918 September 1943), the Capture of Naples (22 September1 October), and the Volturno Crossing (1215 October). It then returned to the United Kingdom, arriving on 4 January 1944. It continued to support 7th Armoured Division, as a follow up formation, following the Normandy Landings In 1945, the regiment led the Allied Victory parade in Berlin, and fired the Victory Salute.

Post War
After World War II the regiment served in the UK, West Germany, Aden, Egypt, Kenya (September 1961-September 1964 with the regiment's main body at Alanbrooke Barracks, Gilgil) Hong Kong and Cyprus. In 1958, C Battery joined the regiment, and M Battery was placed in suspended animation. By 1975, M Battery was revived. In 1976, the regiment completed another tour of Northern Ireland, as part of Operation Banner and later in 1978, the regiment was placed in suspended animation with batteries became independent anti-tank batteries. By 1984, the regiment was reformed in Paderborn, Germany. M Battery was once again placed in suspended animation. The regiment also served in the Former Republic of Yugoslavia. and in 1993, N Battery (The Eagle Troop) joined the regiment, and M Battery was amalgamated with Headquarters Battery to form M Headquarters Battery. Furthermore, in 1999, the regiment deployed with UNPROFOR to Bosnia

In 1998, the regiment moved to Caen Barracks, Hohne Station, in Germany to succeed 40th Regiment Royal Artillery and become part of the 7th Armoured Brigade, the Desert Rats. They remained in Hohne until it closed in 2015.

In December 2000 D Battery deployed as part of NATO's KFOR to Kosovo on Op Agricola.

Under Army 2020, the regiment will provide force support to the Adaptable Force. In 2013 it re-roled from AS-90s to L118 Light Guns. From 1 March 2015, the 105th Regiment Royal Artillery will be paired with this regiment. Under Army 2020 Refine the regiment will support one of the new STRIKE Brigades, utilising the L118 Light Gun.

Under the Future Soldier Programme, the regiment merged with the 1st Deep Recce Strike Brigade Combat Team (a merger of 1st Armoured Infantry Brigade and 1st Artillery Brigade) in 1 July 2022.  By January 2024, the regiment will re-role to the Deep Fires role losing its L118 Light guns and replace them with new M270 MLR Systems.  Two batteries (C & D) will re-equip with the M270, while J (Sidi Rezegh) Battery will become the headquarters battery and M Battery will be placed in suspended animation. N Battery (Eagle Troop) will join 7 Parachute Regiment, RHA as N Parachute Battery (Eagle Troop). On deployment, the regiment would be supported by a battery of the reserve 101st (Northumbrian) Regiment, RA.

Batteries
The regiment consists of the following batteries:
M (Headquarters) Battery
J (Sidi Rezegh) Battery – TAC Battery
N Battery (Eagle Troop) – TAC Battery
C Battery – Light Gun
D Battery – Light Gun
Royal Electrical and Mechanical Engineers Light Aid Detachment

Equipment

The regiment has been equipped with the following weapons during its existence:
QF 3.7-inch mountain howitzer
Ordnance QF 2-pounder anti-tank gun2 pounder
Ordnance QF 25-pounder field gun-howitzer25 pounder
Sexton self-propelled 25 pounder
BL 5.5-inch Medium Gun5.5" Gun
OTO Melara Mod 56105mm Pack Howitzer
FV433 Abbot SPG 105mm self-propelled howitzer
Swingfire anti-tank guided missile
FH70 155mm towed howitzer
AS-90 155mm self-propelled howitzer
L118 light gun 105mm towed howitzer

See also

British Army
Royal Artillery
Royal Horse Artillery
List of Royal Artillery Batteries

Notes

References

Bibliography

External links 
 3rd Regiment Royal Horse Artillery Official Website
 
 

Royal Horse Artillery regiments
Royal Horse Artillery 003
Military units and formations established in 1938